Millettia is a large, broadly distributed genus of flowering plants in the legume family, Fabaceae. , there are over 180 accepted species in Kew's Plants of the World Online. Species are found in tropical and subtropical areas throughout the Old World.

References
 PlantList search for millettia. Retrieved 20210327.

L
Millettia